Hebeloma gigaspermum is a European species of mushroom in the family Hymenogastraceae.

The species Hebeloma gigaspermum was first described only in 1981 and is externally similar to the much better known Hebeloma sacchariolens (being placed in subsection Sacchariolentia of the genus).  It is not uncommon in Northern Europe and until 1981 examples were probably simply considered to be H. sacchariolens.

It is distinguished from H. sacchariolens by 
its ecology with willow and alder in boggy ground (as opposed to forests and gardens with broad-leaved trees in general), and
its large spore size of 13–17 × 7–9 μm (as opposed to 11–14 × 6–8 μm).

The name gigaspermum means "giant-spored".

The edibility of the mushroom is not known for certain, but Hebeloma contains poisonous species and it is not to be recommended for culinary use.

References

gigaspermum
Fungi of Europe
Fungi described in 1981